Akbar Misaghian (born May 21, 1953) is an Iranian retired football player and coach. After retirement, he managed several clubs most notably F.C. Aboumoslem.

Playing career

Club career
He started his playing career in 1971 when he played for Bootan Tehran while working for Bootan Gas Company. He then moved to Mashhad and played for Aboumoslem. In 1976, he left Mashhad for Bandar Anzali to play for Malavan for two seasons. Then he played for Esteghlal for three seasons and finally in 1982 he returned to Mashhad and started playing for Aboumoslem once again.

International career
In 1973 Misaghian was called up to the Iran national football team selection camp, however failed to impress enough to maintain a place in the squad.

Personal life
Akbar Misaghian is the father of Mes Kerman player Behtash Misaghian.

Honours

Manager

Aboumoslem Khorasan
2nd Division (1): 1997–98
Hazfi Cup (1): 2004–05 (Runner-up)

Payam Khorasan
2nd Division (1): 2000–01

Shamoushak
Azadegan League (1): 2002–03

Shahrdari Tabriz
Azadegan League (1): 2009–10

Aluminium Hormozgan
Azadegan League (1): 2011–12

Padideh Khorasan
Azadegan League (1): 2013–14

Mes Kerman
Azadegan League (1): 2014–15 (Runners-up / Promoted of second Playoffs)

External links
 Akbar Misaghian Official Website
  Misaghian named as Rah Ahan Manager

Iranian football managers
Iranian footballers
F.C. Aboomoslem players
Esteghlal F.C. players
Malavan players
Shahr Khodro F.C. managers
People from Golestan Province
1953 births
Living people
Association football defenders
Aluminium Hormozgan F.C. managers
Persian Gulf Pro League managers
Shahin Bushehr F.C. managers
Malavan F.C. managers